The , also known as the , was a non-aggression pact between the Soviet Union and the Empire of Japan signed on April 13, 1941, two years after the conclusion of the Soviet-Japanese Border War. The agreement meant that for most of World War II, the two nations fought against each other's allies but not against each other. In 1945, late in the war, the Soviets scrapped the pact and joined the Allied campaign against Japan.

Background
After the Fall of France and then the expansion of the Axis Powers, the Soviet Union wished to mend its diplomatic relations in the Far East to safeguard its eastern border and to concentrate on the European Theatre of World War II. On the other hand, the Empire of Japan was bogged down in a seemingly-interminable war against China and had rapidly-deteriorating diplomatic relations with the United States. Those factors made the Japanese seek an accommodation with the Soviet Union to improve its international standing and to secure the northern border of Manchukuo from a possible Soviet invasion.

Soviet Premier Joseph Stalin was initially unaware of Adolf Hitler's briefing to his generals that an attack on the Soviet Union by the European Axis Powers would let Japan overtly challenge the United States. That briefing was based on the belief that if such an attack occurred, the Soviet Union would be too preoccupied with fighting Nazi Germany. That would make Japan feel less threatened by any possible Soviet invasion of Manchukuo and allow Japan to have enough provisions and capabilities to start a war against the United States. The pact would allow both Japan and the Soviet Union to avoid fighting on multiple fronts.

Stalin believed that his "problems can be solved in a natural way if the Soviets and the Japanese cooperate". After concluding the nonaggression treaty, Stalin, in an unprecedented gesture, saw Japanese Foreign Minister Yosuke Matsuoka off at the train station. That was symbolic of the importance that Stalin, who rarely appeared before foreign diplomats, attached to the treaty. It also provided him with the occasion, in the presence of the entire diplomatic corps, to invite negotiations with Germany and to flaunt his increased bargaining power.

Signing
The treaty was signed in Moscow on April 13, 1941, by Foreign Minister Yosuke Matsuoka and Ambassador Yoshitsugu Tatekawa for Japan and Foreign Minister Vyacheslav Molotov for the Soviet Union.

The same day, all three men also signed a declaration regarding Mongolia and Manchukuo. The Soviet Union pledged to respect the territorial integrity and the inviolability of Manchukuo, and Japan did the same for Mongolia.

Effects
Later in 1941, Japan, as a signatory of the Tripartite Pact, considered denouncing the Soviet–Japanese Neutrality Pact, especially after the German invasion of the Soviet Union, but it made the crucial decision to keep the pact and to expand southwards by instead invading the European colonies in Southeast Asia. That had a direct bearing on the Battle of Moscow since the absence of a Japanese threat allowed the Soviets to move large forces from Siberia and to send them to the front against the Germans. 

It is possible that if the Germans had won the Battle of Stalingrad, Japan would have invaded Siberia. General Tomoyuki Yamashita, who was known for his achievements in the Battle of Singapore, was sent to Manchuria in July 1942 and tasked with organizing troops for the invasion.

At the Yalta Conference in February 1945, Stalin secretly agreed to enter the war against Japan in exchange for American and British recognition of certain Soviet territorial claims in Asia. The Soviet offensive was to start within three months after the end of the war in Europe.

Soviet denunciation
On April 5, 1945, the Soviet Union denounced the pact with Japan by informing the Japanese government that "in accordance with Article Three of the above mentioned pact, which envisaged the right of denunciation one year before the lapse of the five-year period of operation of the pact, the Soviet Government hereby makes known to the Government of Japan its wish to denounce the pact of April 13, 1941." The wording of the denunciation suggested that the Soviet Union wished to see the treaty go out of effect immediately, and Time magazine reported that the Soviet Foreign Commissar's tone indicated that the Soviet Union might soon go to war against Japan.

The text of the treaty had stated that the pact remained "valid for five years," (April 13, 1941 - April 13, 1946). When Japanese Ambassador Naotake Sato pressed him, Molotov assured him that the treaty would remain in force until April 1946. The treaty also stated, "In case neither of the Contracting Parties denounces the Pact one year before the expiration of the term, it will be considered automatically prolonged for the next five years" (April 13, 1946 - April 13, 1951). The denunciation came on April 5, 1945, which under those terms meant that the treaty would not renew on April 13, 1946.

On May 8 or 9, 1945, the date depending on the time zone, Nazi Germany surrendered, which ended the war in Europe and started the secret three-month countdown for the Soviets to start hostilities against Japan. On August 9, 1945, just after midnight in Manchuria, the Soviets invaded Manchuria. The declaration of war against Japan followed nearly six hours later. Because of the time zone difference of 7 hours, the declaration of war could be still dated August 8, 1945 and was presented to the Japanese ambassador in Moscow at 11 p.m. Moscow time.

During the Soviet invasion, Japanese forces on the Asian mainland were unprepared to resist and were overrun relatively quickly. In the last campaign of the war, Soviet territorial gains in Asia were Manchukuo, Mengjiang (Inner Mongolia) and northern Korea.

Text of pact

Text of declaration

Text of denunciation

Text of declaration of war

See also
Japan–Soviet Union relations
Molotov–Ribbentrop Pact
Italo-Soviet Pact
Potsdam Conference, Potsdam Declaration

References

Military history of Japan during World War II
Treaties of the Soviet Union
World War II treaties
Soviet Union in World War II
Mongolian People's Republic
History of Manchuria
Germany–Soviet Union relations
Treaties concluded in 1941
Treaties entered into force in 1941
1941 in Japan
1941 in the Soviet Union
Japan–Russia relations
Japan–Soviet Union relations
Treaties of the Empire of Japan
Non-aggression pacts
April 1941 events
1941 in Moscow
Axis powers
Japan–Russia treaties